This is a complete filmography of Mexican film actress Lupe Vélez. Vélez began her career in 1927, when she abandoned her native Mexico to start a career as an exotic beauty in  the 1920s Hollywood.  Vélez began her career in Mexico as a dancer, before moving to the U.S. where she worked in vaudeville. She was seen by Fanny Brice who promoted her, and Vélez soon entered films, making her first appearance in 1927. Vélez's first feature-length film was The Gaucho (1927) starring Douglas Fairbanks. By the end of the decade she had progressed to leading roles. With the advent of talking pictures Vélez acted in comedies. She worked with directors as D. W. Griffith, Victor Fleming, William Wyler and Cecil B. DeMille among others, and with stars like Gary Cooper, Warner Baxter, Jimmy Durante, Oliver Hardy and Stan Laurel among others.. But she became disappointed with her film career, and moved to New York where she worked in Broadway productions.
Returning to Hollywood in 1939, she made a series of comedies named Mexican Spitfire. The Spitfire films rejuvenated Vélez's career. She also made some films in Mexico.
Vélez was one of the first Mexican actresses to succeed in Hollywood. The others are Dolores del Río, Katy Jurado and in more recent years, Salma Hayek.

Filmography

1927–1929

1930–1938

1939–1944

Short films appearing as herself

Theatre

References
 
 

Actress filmographies
Mexican filmographies